Iradj Raad (born 1945, in Tehran) is an Iranian actor.

He studied theatre in FFATU and Cardiff University in Wales.

Some of his plays
 The Postman, 1972
 The Cycle, 1975 (screened in 1978)
 The Lodgers, 1986
 Half of the World, 1992
 Passion of Love, 1999
 A Candle in Wind, 2003
 Madare sefr darajeh, 2007

References

External links
 

1945 births
Living people
People from Tehran
People from Borujerd
University of Tehran alumni
Alumni of Cardiff University
Iranian male television actors
Iranian male stage actors
Iranian male film actors